The 1974–75 Golden State Warriors season was the 29th season in the franchise's history, its 13th in California and the fourth playing in Oakland. After four seasons of second-place division finishes, the Warriors made various changes. Nate Thurmond was traded to the Chicago Bulls for Clifford Ray, a young defensive center. The club drafted Keith Wilkes (later known as Jamaal Wilkes), whose nickname was "Silk". Cazzie Russell had played out his option and joined the Los Angeles Lakers, leaving Rick Barry as the team's leader. Coach Al Attles implemented a team-oriented system that drew on the contributions of as many as ten players during a game. Barry scored 30.6 points per game, led the NBA in free throw percentage and steals per game, and was sixth in the league in assists per game.  The Warriors captured the Pacific Division title with a 48–34 record.

In the playoffs, the Warriors got to the Western Conference Finals by beating the Seattle SuperSonics in six games. In the Western Finals, the Warriors looked like they were about to lose to former teammate Nate Thurmond. The Warriors found themselves down against the Chicago Bulls 3 games to 2. The Warriors rallied to win Game 6 in Chicago and took the series with an 83–79 Game 7 triumph in Oakland. In the NBA Finals, the Warriors faced off against the Washington Bullets. The Warriors took the series in four straight games, including 1-point wins in Games 2 and 4. Rick Barry was named the series MVP.

The Warriors wouldn't make another NBA Finals appearance again until 2015, where the team faced off against the Cleveland Cavaliers and won its fourth league title. They would also go on to defeat the Cavaliers and Boston Celtics in 2017, 2018 and 2022, respectively.

Offseason

Draft picks

Roster

Regular season

Season standings

Record vs. opponents

Playoffs

|- align="center" bgcolor="#ccffcc"
| 1
| April 14
| Seattle
| W 123–96
| Rick Barry (39)
| Clifford Ray (13)
| Rick Barry (11)
| Oakland–Alameda County Coliseum Arena12,279
| 1–0
|- align="center" bgcolor="#ffcccc"
| 2
| April 16
| Seattle
| L 99–100
| Rick Barry (29)
| Ray, Dickey (10)
| Barry, Beard (6)
| Oakland–Alameda County Coliseum Arena12,787
| 1–1
|- align="center" bgcolor="#ccffcc"
| 3
| April 17
| @ Seattle
| W 105–96
| Rick Barry (33)
| George Johnson (13)
| Rick Barry (7)
| Seattle Center Coliseum14,082
| 2–1
|- align="center" bgcolor="#ffcccc"
| 4
| April 19
| @ Seattle
| L 94–111
| Jamaal Wilkes (22)
| Wilkes, Ray (9)
| three players tied (3)
| Seattle Center Coliseum14,082
| 2–2
|- align="center" bgcolor="#ccffcc"
| 5
| April 22
| Seattle
| W 124–100
| Jamaal Wilkes (24)
| Ray, G. Johnson (13)
| Rick Barry (10)
| Oakland–Alameda County Coliseum Arena12,787
| 3–2
|- align="center" bgcolor="#ccffcc"
| 6
| April 24
| @ Seattle
| W 105–96
| Rick Barry (31)
| George Johnson (15)
| Charles Johnson (6)
| Seattle Center Coliseum14,082
| 4–2
|-

|- align="center" bgcolor="#ccffcc"
| 1
| April 27
| Chicago
| W 107–89
| Rick Barry (38)
| George Johnson (11)
| Butch Beard (9)
| Oakland–Alameda County Coliseum Arena12,787
| 1–0
|- align="center" bgcolor="#ffcccc"
| 2
| April 30
| @ Chicago
| L 89–90
| Rick Barry (26)
| Clifford Ray (7)
| Rick Barry (8)
| Chicago Stadium18,533
| 1–1
|- align="center" bgcolor="#ffcccc"
| 3
| May 4
| @ Chicago
| L 101–108
| Butch Beard (28)
| Rick Barry (7)
| Rick Barry (9)
| Chicago Stadium19,128
| 1–2
|- align="center" bgcolor="#ccffcc"
| 4
| May 6
| Chicago
| W 111–106
| Rick Barry (36)
| Clifford Ray (18)
| Rick Barry (9)
| Oakland–Alameda County Coliseum Arena12,787
| 2–2
|- align="center" bgcolor="#ffcccc"
| 5
| May 8
| Chicago
| L 79–89
| Rick Barry (20)
| Clifford Ray (12)
| Rick Barry (4)
| Oakland–Alameda County Coliseum Arena12,787
| 2–3
|- align="center" bgcolor="#ccffcc"
| 6
| May 11
| @ Chicago
| W 86–72
| Rick Barry (36)
| Bill Bridges (11)
| three players tied (3)
| Chicago Stadium19,594
| 3–3
|- align="center" bgcolor="#ccffcc"
| 7
| May 14
| Chicago
| W 83–79
| Jamaal Wilkes (23)
| Clifford Ray (12)
| Rick Barry (4)
| Oakland–Alameda County Coliseum Arena
| 4–3
|-

|- align="center" bgcolor="#ccffcc"
| 1
| May 18
| @ Washington
| W 101–95
| Rick Barry (24)
| Clifford Ray (16)
| Rick Barry (5)
| Capital Centre19,035
| 1–0
|- align="center" bgcolor="#ccffcc"
| 2
| May 20
| Washington
| W 92–91
| Rick Barry (36)
| Rick Barry (9)
| three players tied (4)
| Cow Palace13,225
| 2–0
|- align="center" bgcolor="#ccffcc"
| 3
| May 23
| Washington
| W 109–101
| Rick Barry (38)
| Jamaal Wilkes (10)
| Rick Barry (6)
| Cow Palace13,225
| 3–0
|- align="center" bgcolor="#ccffcc"
| 4
| May 25
| @ Washington
| W 96–95
| Rick Barry (20)
| Clifford Ray (11)
| Rick Barry (5)
| Capital Centre19,035
| 4–0
|-

Awards and honors
 Rick Barry, NBA Finals Most Valuable Player Award
 Rick Barry, All-NBA First Team
 Rick Barry, NBA All-Star Game
 Jamaal Wilkes, NBA Rookie of the Year Award
 Jamaal Wilkes, NBA All-Rookie Team 1st Team
 Dick Vertlieb, NBA Executive of the Year Award

References

 Warriors on Basketball Reference

Golden State
Western Conference (NBA) championship seasons
NBA championship seasons
Golden State Warriors seasons
Golden
Golden